Nyctimenius sabahensis is a species of beetle in the family Cerambycidae. It was described by Masao Hayashi in 1975. It is known from Borneo and Malaysia.

References

Lamiinae
Beetles described in 1975